Marc Richard Sagmoen (born April 16, 1971) is an American former professional baseball outfielder. He was drafted by the Texas Rangers in the 13th round of the 1993 Major League Baseball Draft and signed on June 8, 1993.

Inside-the-park home run
Sagmoen is one of the few players to record his first Major League base hit as an inside-the-park home run. It would also be the only home run he hit. This came on April 17, 1997 at Kauffman Stadium against the Kansas City Royals in the top of the 5th inning versus Tim Belcher. The Rangers won the game 5 to 1.

Jersey number
Sagmoen made his Major League debut on April 15, 1997, wearing the #42 that he had been assigned by Rangers management. On that same day Major League Baseball retired the number league-wide in tribute to Jackie Robinson, commemorating the 50th anniversary of Robinson breaking the color barrier in 1947. Therefore Sagmoen became the last player to make his debut in the number.

External links
, or Retrosheet

1971 births
Living people
All-American college baseball players
American expatriate baseball players in Canada
Baseball players from Texas
Charleston Rainbows players
Charlotte Rangers players
Edmonton Trappers players
Erie Sailors players
Major League Baseball outfielders
Navegantes del Magallanes players
American expatriate baseball players in Venezuela
Nebraska Cornhuskers baseball players
New Orleans Zephyrs players
Oklahoma City 89ers players
Oklahoma RedHawks players
Baseball players from Seattle
Texas Rangers players
Tulsa Drillers players